Phulgran is a village and union council situated in the Islamabad Capital Territory of Pakistan. Its geographical coordinates are 33° 45' 0" North, 73° 13' 0" East and its original name (with diacritics) is Phulgrān.

The jurisdiction of Phulgran includes the following towns:

 Phulgran
 Shahpur
 Sakrila
 Dohala
 Babbri Petha
 Athal
 Maira Begwal
 Chattar
 Karlot
 Hotran
 Kathar
 Mangal
 Pind Begwal
 Chaniari
 Rakh Maira A & B

References 

Union councils of Islamabad Capital Territory
Villages in Islamabad Capital Territory